Pentti Johannes Lammio (24 October 1919 – 25 July 1999) was a Finnish speed skater who competed in the 1948 Winter Olympics and in the 1952 Winter Olympics.

He was born in Tampere and died in Kulju, Lempäälä.

In 1948 he won the bronze medal in the 10000 metres event. He also finished eighth in the 5000 metres competition and 21st in the 1500 metres event.

External links
 Profile

1919 births
1999 deaths
Finnish male speed skaters
Olympic speed skaters of Finland
Speed skaters at the 1948 Winter Olympics
Speed skaters at the 1952 Winter Olympics
Olympic bronze medalists for Finland
Olympic medalists in speed skating
Medalists at the 1948 Winter Olympics
Sportspeople from Tampere
20th-century Finnish people